The 1991 Winston 500 was the ninth stock car race of the 1991 NASCAR Winston Cup Series and the 22nd iteration of the event. The race was originally scheduled to be held on Sunday, May 5, 1991, but was delayed to Monday, May 6, due to rain. The race was held before an audience of 105,000 in Lincoln, Alabama at Talladega Superspeedway, a 2.66 miles (4.28 km) permanent triangle-shaped superspeedway. The race took the scheduled 188 laps to complete. Running on a fuel strategy, Leo Jackson Motorsports driver Harry Gant would manage to drive the last 56 laps of the race on one tank of fuel to take his 12th career NASCAR Winston Cup Series victory and his first victory of the season.

On lap 72 of the race, a 20-car crash would occur when Morgan–McClure Motorsports driver Ernie Irvan's car hit both Kyle Petty and Mark Martin's cars, causing a chain reaction crash in the field. In the crash, Kyle Petty would suffer a broken left femur, causing Petty to miss the next several races due to his injury. Irvan would take most of the blame for causing the crash by drivers, with many of the drivers involved in the crash claiming that Irvan had been "out of control" for the entire race leading up to that point.

Background 

Talladega Superspeedway, originally known as Alabama International Motor Superspeedway (AIMS), is a motorsports complex located north of Talladega, Alabama. It is located on the former Anniston Air Force Base in the small city of Lincoln. The track is a tri-oval and was constructed in the 1960s by the International Speedway Corporation, a business controlled by the France family. Talladega is most known for its steep banking and the unique location of the start/finish line that's located just past the exit to pit road. The track currently hosts the NASCAR series such as the NASCAR Cup Series, Xfinity Series and the Camping World Truck Series. Talladega is the longest NASCAR oval, a  tri-oval like the Daytona International Speedway, which also is a  tri-oval.

Entry list 

 (R) denotes rookie driver.

Qualifying 
Qualifying was split into two rounds. The first round was held on Thursday, May 2, at 4:30 PM EST. Each driver would have one lap to set a time. During the first round, the top 20 drivers in the round would be guaranteed a starting spot in the race. If a driver was not able to guarantee a spot in the first round, they had the option to scrub their time from the first round and try and run a faster lap time in a second round qualifying run, held on Saturday, May 3, at 4:30 PM EST. As with the first round, each driver would have one lap to set a time. For this specific race, positions 21-40 would be decided on time, and depending on who needed it, a select amount of positions were given to cars who had not otherwise qualified but were high enough in owner's points; up to two were given. If needed, a past champion who did not qualify on either time or provisionals could use a champion's provisional, adding one more spot to the field.

Five drivers would fail to qualify.

Full qualifying results

Race results

Standings after the race 

Drivers' Championship standings

Note: Only the first 10 positions are included for the driver standings.

References 

1991 NASCAR Winston Cup Series
NASCAR races at Talladega Superspeedway
May 1991 sports events in the United States
1991 in sports in Alabama